Structural Equations with Latent Variables is a statistics textbook by Kenneth Bollen which describes the framework of structural equation modeling. It is often used in graduate-level courses for structural equation modeling in the social sciences.  

Structural Equations with Latent Variables discusses LISREL/structural equation models and presents information on measurement validity and reliability, overall fit indices, model identification, causality, and other subjects. The book features examples from sociology, economics, and psychology to illustrate the methods.

Chapters
 Introduction
 Model Notation, Covariances, and Path Analysis
 Causality and Causal Models
 Structural Equation Models with Observed Variables
 The Consequences of Measurement Error
 Measurement Models: The Relation between Latent and Observed Variables
 Confirmatory Factor Analysis
 The General Model, Part I: Latent Variables and Measurement Models Combined
 The General Model, Part II: Extensions

Reviews

Kenneth Bollen's new book, Structural Equations with Latent Variables is a "comprehensive introduction" to the LISREL approach to covariance structure analysis. It is clearly written, insightful, and complete. In it, Bollen covers both basic and advanced topics, provides his own useful insights into controversies and recent developments, and makes good use of empirical examples to illustrate important points. He also stresses, at every point, that substantive knowledge and the theory of the process being modeled are indispensable for using the method fruitfully.

— Ross L. Matsueda (1991)

References

1989 non-fiction books
Statistics books
Structural equation models